Spinarerpeton is an extinct genus of discosauriscid seymouriamorph known from the early Permian of Boskovice Furrow, in the Czech Republic. It was first named by Jozef Klembara in 2009 and the type species is Spinarerpeton brevicephalum. A phylogenetic analysis places Spinarerpeton as the sister taxon to Makowskia.

References

Permian tetrapods
Seymouriamorphs
Fossil taxa described in 2009
Fossils of the Czech Republic